A. R. Mitra is a writer and researcher from Karnataka India. He writes about Kannada literature and humor writing.

Early life
Born on February 25, 1935, at Belur in the Hassan district, he had his education in Hassan, Arsikere, Kolar and Mysuru. After doing his post-graduate work at Mysore University, Prof. Mitra served as a lecturer at St. Joseph College in Bengaluru and retired as principal of Maharani College.

Books and works
Vachankararu Mathu Shabdakalpa
Naneke Koreyuttene
Olanotagalu
Balconiya Bandugalu
Yaaro Bandiddaru
Jagattina Pranaya Kathegala Samputa
Prema Nadiya Dadgalali 
Kumaravyasa Bharatha Kathamitra

References 

Kannada-language writers
1935 births
Living people
Recipients of the Rajyotsava Award 2022